Ervin Kovács (born 24 January 1967) is a Hungarian former football player.

FIFA Youth World Cup
In 1985, Kovács was a member of the Hungarian Squad that participated in the FIFA Under-20 World Cup.

He's now trainer of Maria Ter-Heide, a club in Belgium .

Honours
Germinal Ekeren
 Belgian Cup: 1996–97

References 

 
 FIFA Official website
 
 Magyar Version of Wikipedia

1967 births
Living people
Hungarian footballers
Hungary international footballers
Hungary youth international footballers
Hungarian expatriate footballers
Újpest FC players
Budapest Honvéd FC players
Nemzeti Bajnokság I players
Belgian Pro League players
Expatriate footballers in Belgium
Association football defenders